JS Kenryū (SS-504) is the fourth boat of Sōryū-class submarines. She was commissioned on 16 March 2012.

Construction and career
Kenryū was laid down at Kawasaki Heavy Industries Kobe Shipyard on March 31, 2008, as the 2007 plan 2900-ton submarine No. 8119 based on the medium-term defense capability development plan. At the launching ceremony, it was named Kenryū and launched on 15 November 2010. She's commissioned on 16 March 2012 and deployed to Kure.

Participated in US dispatch training (to Hawaii) from January 18 to April 9, 2016.

From February 12 to May 10, 2020, offshore training and facility utilization training will be conducted in the Hawaiian Islands area.

Gallery

Citations

External links

2010 ships
Sōryū-class submarines
Ships built by Kawasaki Heavy Industries